Iclazepam (Clazepam) is a drug which is a benzodiazepine derivative. It has sedative and anxiolytic effects similar to those produced by other benzodiazepine derivatives, and is around the same potency as chlordiazepoxide.

Iclazepam is a derivative of nordazepam substituted with a cyclopropylmethoxyethyl group on the N1 nitrogen. Once in the body, iclazepam is quickly metabolised to nordazepam and its N-(2-hydroxyethyl) derivative, which are thought to be mainly responsible for its effects.

See also
List of benzodiazepines

References

Benzodiazepines
Chloroarenes
Ethers
GABAA receptor positive allosteric modulators
Lactams